Without a Net is a 2012 American documentary film directed by Kelly J Richardson.

Synopsis
In an abandoned parking lot in a Rio de Janeiro favela sits a circus tent—an incongruous sight, but no more unusual than its motley crew of young performers, searching for a life apart from the drug-related violence around them. As chronicled by first-time feature filmmaker Kelly J Richardson, putting on a show takes rigor and resourcefulness in their impoverished community, and even this modest production of acrobats and contortionists isn't free of injuries and ego clashes. But the big top is their oasis, and the human drama of hope and ambition the greatest show on earth.

Reception
The film had a theatrical release and Academy Qualifying run in Los Angeles and New York City through International Documentary Association (IDA)'s DocuWeeks, was voted a "Festival Favorite" at the Atlanta Film Festival, and screened in the Mill Valley Film Festival, Raindance Film Festival in London, Hot Springs Documentary Film Festival, San Francisco Documentary Film Festival, Red Rock Film Festival, and others.

References

External links

2012 films
American documentary films
Portuguese-language films
2012 documentary films
Documentary films about circus performers
Films shot in Rio de Janeiro (city)
2010s American films